Nicola Stevens (born 24 March 1993) is an Australian rules footballer playing for St Kilda in the AFL Women's (AFLW). She previously played for Collingwood in 2017 and for Carlton in 2018–2022. Stevens was selected in the inaugural AFL Women's All-Australian team and was the inaugural Collingwood best and fairest winner during her only season with the Magpies in 2017.

Early life
Stevens grew up supporting the Essendon Football Club, having had two family members (both life members) involved at the club at different capacities. Stevens started playing Auskick and played local football throughout her childhood. In 2013, Stevens began playing for Melbourne University in the Victorian Women's Football League (VWFL), now the VFL Women's (VFLW).

She continued to play for the Bulldogs in AFL exhibition games in three of the next four seasons, missing the 2014 season with a knee injury.

AFL Women's career

Collingwood (2017)
Inaugural Magpies coach Wayne Siekman considered Stevens to be "the best defender in the draft". She made her debut in the inaugural AFL Women's match against  at Ikon Park. Stevens was selected in the inaugural AFL Women's All-Australian team and was announced as Collingwood's inaugural best-and-fairest winner after a consistent first season. On 2 September, Stevens played for Victoria in the inaugural AFL Women's State of Origin match.

Carlton (2018–2022)
In May 2017, Stevens was traded to Carlton, along with Collingwood's fourth-round draft selection, in exchange for Carlton's first, second and third draft selections in the 2017 AFL Women's draft. Stevens had a quiet first season at Carlton, but kicked her first career goal in round 2 against  at Drummoyne Oval. She also played for Carlton's VFL Women's team in its inaugural season in the competition. Stevens re-signed with Carlton during the trade and signing period in May 2018.

St Kilda (2022–present)
In May 2022, Stevens was traded to St Kilda for a first round compensation pick, marking the first trade of the window.

Statistics
Statistics are correct to the end of round 1, 2019.

|- style="background:#EAEAEA"
| scope="row" text-align:center | 2017
| 
| 21 || 7 || 0 || 0 || 50 || 17 || 67 || 23 || 22 || 0.0 || 0.0 || 7.1 || 2.4 || 9.6 || 3.3 || 3.1 || 2
|- 
| scope="row" text-align:center | 2018
| 
| 21 || 7 || 1 || 1 || 41 || 16 || 57 || 11 || 23 || 0.2 || 0.2 || 5.9 || 2.3 || 8.1 || 1.6 || 3.3 || 0
|- style="background:#EAEAEA"
| scope="row" text-align:center | 2019
| 
| 21 || 1 || 0 || 0 || 7 || 2 || 9 || 1 || 2 || 0.0 || 0.0 || 7.0 || 2.0 || 9.0 || 1.0 || 2.0 || 
|- class="sortbottom"
! colspan=3 | Career
! 15
! 1
! 1
! 98
! 35
! 133
! 35
! 47
! 0.1
! 0.1
! 6.5
! 2.3
! 8.9
! 2.3
! 3.1
! 2
|}

Honours and achievements
Individual
 AFL Women's All-Australian team: 2017
 Collingwood best and fairest: 2017
 Victoria representative honours in AFL Women's State of Origin: 2017

References

External links 

Living people
1993 births
Collingwood Football Club (AFLW) players
Carlton Football Club (AFLW) players
Australian rules footballers from Melbourne
All-Australians (AFL Women's)
Melbourne University Football Club (VFLW) players
People from Brunswick, Victoria
Sportswomen from Victoria (Australia)